Denise Firmin Garner (born December 9, 1956) is an American politician serving as a member of the Arkansas House of Representatives from the 84th district in Washington County since 2019.

Political career

Election
Garner was elected in the general election on November 6, 2018, winning 55 percent of the vote over 45 percent of Republican candidate Charlie Collins.

References

Garner, Denise
Living people
21st-century American politicians
21st-century American women politicians
Women state legislators in Arkansas
1956 births